Women  is a 1985 Hong Kong drama film directed by Stanley Kwan in his directorial debut. Like Kwan's following films, Women focuses on female characters and their efforts to overcome cultural restrictions. The cast includes Cora Miao, Chow Yun-fat, Cherie Chung and Elaine Jin. It was nominated for nine Hong Kong Film Awards including Best Picture.

Plot synopsis
The film follows Po-yee (Cora Miao) as she starts her new life as a single mother after divorcing her husband, Derek (Chow Yun-fat), having found out he was having an affair with another woman, Sha-nau (Cherie Chung).

Cast
 Cora Miao as Liang Bo-Er
 Chow Yun-Fat as Derek Sun (as Chow Yun Fat)
 Cherie Chung as Sha Niu
 Ngan Lee as Bo-Er's mom

Awards and nominations
The film was nominated for nine Hong Kong Film Awards but failed to win any.  In addition Cora Miao received a Best Actress nomination at the Golden Horse Film Festival.

5th Hong Kong Film Awards:
Nominations:
Best Picture
Best Director (Stanley Kwan)
Best Actor (Chow Yun-fat)
Best Actress (Cora Miao)
Best Supporting Actress (Elaine Jin)
Best Screenplay (Tai An-Ping Chiu, Kit Lai)
Best Cinematography (Bill Wong)
Best Original Film Score (Wing-fai Law)
Best Art Direction (Tony Au)

Golden Horse Film Festival:
Nominations:
Best Actress (Cora Miao)

References

External links
 
 
 
 

1985 films
1980s Cantonese-language films
Hong Kong drama films
1985 drama films
Films directed by Stanley Kwan
Shaw Brothers Studio films
Films set in Hong Kong
Films shot in Hong Kong
1985 directorial debut films
1980s Hong Kong films